Lawrence James Metcalf (1928–2017) was a New Zealand horticulturalist, botanist, conservationist and author of gardening and plant identification books. Metcalf popularized and advocated for the planting of native or indigenous plant species in both public and private gardens and pioneered their propagation techniques (horticulture). In 1991 the British Royal Horticultural Society recognized his work on the cultivation of New Zealand's native plants, with the Gold Veitch Memorial Medal.

Professional work 
Metcalf was a global authority on the ''Hebe'' (plant) genus,  indigenous to New Zealand,  and planted widely around the world in public gardens with temperate climates
As the Assistant Curator (later Assistant Director) of Christchurch Botanic Gardens, Metcalf founded and expanded its International Seed Exchange programme.   

After  more than 20 years at Christchurch Botanic Gardens, Metcalf became the Director of Parks and Recreation at the Invercargill City Council until his retirement in 1992. During his retirement Metcalf wrote many popular books on identifying New Zealand plants, and on native plant propagation and gardening,.

In 2017, the Herbarium at Christchurch Botanic Gardens was named in his honour. It contains many dried plant specimens collected by Metcalf during his time as Assistant Curator and Assistant Director.

Awards

1975: Fellow of the New Zealand Institute of Park and Recreation Administration.
1978: The Loder Cup, presented to “encourage and honour New Zealanders who work to investigate, promote, retain and cherish our indigenous flora”.
1988: Associate on Honour (AHRIH) of the RNZIH.
1988: Ian Galloway Outstanding Achievement Award, which “Recognizes outstanding contribution in the Parks, Amenity Horticulture and Open space”.
1991: Gold Veitch Memorial Medal, the highest honour from the Royal Horticultural Society to people outside the United Kingdom.
1999: Honorary Fellow of the New Zealand Institute of Landscape Architects,
2010: Appointed a Companion of the Queen’s Service Order (QSO)
 2017: The Christchurch Botanic Gardens Herbarium was officially renamed the “Lawrie Metcalf Herbarium”.

Bibliography

 Barnett, M. J., Gilpin, H. G. and Metcalf, L. J. Editors (1963) A Garden Century: the Christchurch Botanic Gardens, 1863–1963. Christchurch: Christchurch City Council.
 Metcalf, L. J. (1972) The Cultivation of New Zealand Trees and Shrubs. Wellington, New Zealand: A. H. & A. W. Reed.
 Metcalf, Lawrie (1993) The Cultivation of New Zealand Plants. Auckland, New Zealand: Godwit Press.
 Metcalf, Lawrie (1995) The Propagation of New Zealand Native Plants. Auckland, New Zealand: Godwit Press.
 Metcalf, Lawrie (1998) The Cultivation of New Zealand Native Grasses. Auckland, New Zealand: Godwit Press.
 Metcalf, Lawrie (2002) A Photographic Guide to Trees of New Zealand. Auckland, New Zealand: New Holland Publishers.
 Metcalf, Lawrie (2003) A Photographic Guide to Ferns of New Zealand. Auckland, New Zealand: New Holland Publishers.
 Metcalf, Lawrie (2006) Hebes: a guide to species, hybrids and allied genera. Portland, Oregon, USA: Timber Press.
 Metcalf, Lawrie (2006) Know Your New Zealand Trees. Auckland, New Zealand: New Holland Publishers.
 Metcalf, Lawrie (2006) A Photographic Guide to Alpine Plants of New Zealand. Auckland, New Zealand: New Holland Publishers.
 Metcalf, Lawrie (2007) The Propagation of New Zealand Native Plants (revised). New Zealand: Random House.
 Metcalf, Lawrie (2008) The Cultivation of New Zealand Native Grasses (revised). Auckland, New Zealand: Godwit Press.
 Metcalf, Lawrie (2009) Know Your New Zealand Native Plants. Auckland, New Zealand: New Holland Publishers.
 Metcalf, L. J. (2011) The Cultivation of New Zealand Trees and Shrubs (revised and updated edition). Wellington, Auckland, New Zealand: Raupo, Penguin Group.
 Metcalf, Lawrie and Edwards, Roy. (2014) New Zealand Native Ground Cover Plants: a practical guide for gardeners and landscapers. Christchurch: Canterbury University Press.

References 

Botany books
Gardening in New Zealand